Harry Albert Keegan (November 18, 1882 – August 25, 1968) was a member of the Wisconsin State Assembly.

Biography
Keegan was born on November 18, 1882 in what is now Madison, South Dakota. He later moved to Monroe, Wisconsin. Keegan died in August 1968.

Career
Keegan was a member of the Assembly twice. First, from 1939 to 1946 and second, from 1949 to 1956. He was a Republican. He was a dairy farmer and also worked in the grocery business. Keegan served on the Monroe Common Council.

References

People from Madison, South Dakota
People from Monroe, Wisconsin
Businesspeople from Wisconsin
Wisconsin city council members
Republican Party members of the Wisconsin State Assembly
1882 births
1968 deaths
20th-century American politicians
20th-century American businesspeople